Interphone may refer to:

Intercom, a stand-alone voice communications system for use within a building or small collection of buildings
The Interphone study, an international study investigating the effects of mobile phone radiation on the health of human beings

See also
Interphon Records, an American record label